Alec Stander (born 7 March 1979) is a South African cricketer. He played in three first-class and two List A matches for Border in 2010 and 2011.

See also
 List of Border representative cricketers

References

External links
 

1979 births
Living people
South African cricketers
Border cricketers
People from Ficksburg